Happy Tooth Women's Racing (UCI code HAM) was a professional women's cycling team, based in the United States of America, which competed in elite women's road bicycle racing events in 2015. Before and after 2015 the team competed at domestic level.

Team roster

2015
As of 10 March 2015. Ages as of 1 January 2015.

References

UCI Women's Teams
Cycling teams based in the United States
Women's sports teams in the United States
Cycling teams established in 2013
2015 establishments in the United States